Elaeocarpus pseudopaniculatus is a species of flowering plant in the Elaeocarpaceae family. It is a tree endemic to Peninsular Malaysia, where it is found only in Pahang.

It is threatened by habitat loss. Some populations are protected in Taman Negara.

References

pseudopaniculatus
Endemic flora of Peninsular Malaysia
Trees of Peninsular Malaysia
Conservation dependent plants
Near threatened flora of Asia
Taxonomy articles created by Polbot
Taxa named by E. J. H. Corner